Vasile Stîngă (also Stanga, born 21 January 1957) is a Romanian handball coach and former player. He played 269 matches for Romania men's national handball team, scoring 1414 goals and winning bronze medals at the 1980 and 1984 Olympics. He was the top scorer at the 1982 World Championship and in 1985 was selected for the World Handball Team.

At the club level Stângă played for Steaua Bucharest (1977–1989), winning with them 11 national titles and also reach an EHF Champions League final in 1989, and for Alzira Avidesa (1989–1992) in Spain, and was instrumental in the 1992 Copa del Rey win against Barcelona. He led Steaua to victory in the 2006 EHF Challenge Cup as a coach.

Stîngă is married to the former basketball player Ecaterina Stîngă, they have a son Andrei and a daughter Corina.

See also
List of handballers with 1000 or more international goals

References

1957 births
Living people
Sportspeople from Hunedoara
CSA Steaua București (handball) players
Liga ASOBAL players
Handball players at the 1980 Summer Olympics
Handball players at the 1984 Summer Olympics
Olympic handball players of Romania
Romanian male handball players
Romanian expatriate sportspeople in Spain
Expatriate handball players
Olympic bronze medalists for Romania
Olympic medalists in handball
Romanian handball coaches
Medalists at the 1984 Summer Olympics
Medalists at the 1980 Summer Olympics
Handball coaches of international teams